The Canyon Diablo shootout was a gunfight between American lawmen and a pair of bandits that occurred on April 8, 1905, in the present-day ghost town of Canyon Diablo, Arizona. On the night before, two men named William Evans and John Shaw robbed a saloon in Winslow and made off with at least $200 in coins. Two lawmen pursued the bandits and on the following day they encountered each other in Canyon Diablo. A three-second shootout ensued, which was described at the time as "one huge explosion" that resulted in the death of Shaw and the wounding and capture of Evans.

Background
Little is known about the lives of William Evans and John Shaw before they became bandits. The former was an ex-convict who also went by the name of William Smith, or Smythe. Both were in their early to mid twenties when they decided that banditry would be easier than being a cowboy. The robbery which ultimately led to the shooting in Canyon Diablo occurred on the night of April 7, 1905. Shortly before midnight, Evans and Shaw entered the Wigwam Saloon in Winslow, Arizona, dressed in their finest clothing. The two headed straight for the bar and ordered a couple shots of rot gut, a type of whiskey common at the time. They weren't interested in wasting time, though, and before drinking they turned around and pulled out their revolvers to hold up a group of seven men playing poker at one of the tables. At gunpoint, the two bandits relieved the gamblers of between $200 and $600 worth of silver coins and then fled out the front door without firing a shot.

Pete Pemberton, the deputy sheriff of Navajo County, and owner of the saloon, was immediately notified and after examining the crime scene he informed his superior, Sheriff Chet Houck, who was the younger brother of Jim Houck. Shortly before, Pemberton and the city marshal, Bob Giles, found a trail of silver coins along the railroad tracks leading to Flagstaff so it was assumed that the bandits had jumped on board a moving train and that the coins must have fallen out of their pockets. From Holbrook, Sheriff Houck boarded a train to Flagstaff, where he met up with Pemberton and started an investigation. After finding neither the bandits or any relevant information, they reboarded the train for Winslow. However, on the ride back the lawmen just happened to receive word that two suspicious-looking men had been seen hiding in the bushes along the railroad tracks, near the turn to Canyon Diablo.

The town of Canyon Diablo was located about twenty-five miles west of Winslow, next to the gorge Canyon Diablo and the border of the Navajo Reservation. It was still a wild place in 1905, though by that time it was nearly a ghost town with only a small population. According to the Tombstone Epitaph, Canyon Diablo was described as being the "toughest Hellhole in the West," which may have been at least part of the reason why Evans and Shaw chose to flee there instead of Flagstaff. The two lawmen followed their instincts and stopped the train a couple miles past the town and then got off to walk back on foot. By the time they had made it onto Hell Street, the main road through town, the sun was just beginning to set.

Shootout
Sheriff Houck and Pemberton first made contact with Fred Volz, who owned a small store in town since 1886, where he traded with the Navajo and the Hopi. After the usual questioning, Volz told the policemen that earlier in the day there had been two well-dressed men standing outside the trading post for a long time and acting suspiciously. Just then, Evans and Shaw came around the corner of the trading post and were spotted. The two bandits were walking the opposite way, towards the train depot, so the two lawmen went after them. When they were all about six to eight feet apart, Houck called out for them to submit to a search, to which one of them said: "No one searches us!" The two pairs briefly stood face-to-face when all of a sudden each man went for his sidearm. All four began shooting at point blank range, Houck advanced to within four feet of the bandits.

Having failed to make any hits with his first five shots, Shaw looked down to reload his gun when he was struck in the head by one of Houck's bullets. Pemberton then wounded Evans in the leg and he fell to the ground shooting. With his last bullet, Evans aimed for Houck and fired, but Pemberton shot him again, this time in the shoulder, which knocked the weapon out of his hand. The bullet went through Houck's coat on the left side, grazed him across the stomach, and then exited through the right side. The wound was not considered serious though. In roughly three seconds, Shaw was dead and Evans was badly wounded. As was common in the Old West, most men filled their six-shooters with only five rounds so they could rest the firing pin on an empty slot and avoid accidents. Sheriff Houck, Shaw and Evans each fired all five of their bullets, but Pemberton had one extra, making for a total of twenty-one shots fired.

Aftermath
Immediately after the shootout, Sheriff Houck had the body of Shaw placed in a pine wood coffin, provided by Volz, and buried in a shallow grave because of the extremely rocky soil. Evans was taken to the hospital in Winslow, where he recovered, and later he was sent to Yuma Territorial Prison for nine years. $271 worth of silver coins was found in their possession. On the night after the shooting, a group of cowboys, once employed by the Aztec Land & Cattle Company, were having drinks at the Wigwam Saloon when they heard the news and how both Evans and Shaw failed to drink the shots they had paid for on the night before. One of them came up with the idea of going to Canyon Diablo to exhume Shaw's corpse for one final drink.

Between fifteen and twenty men hastily volunteered for the journey and, as Sheriff Houck and Pemberton did, they hopped aboard a westbound train and made it to Canyon Diablo at about dawn on April 10, 1905. First they had a few more drinks at the train station and then went to borrow some shovels from Fred Volz to proceed with digging up Shaw's coffin. Volz was angry about what the drunken mob intended to do in the cemetery so at first he was reluctant in giving up his tools. However, he eventually gave in and provided not only the shovels, but a Kodak camera. According to differing accounts, Volz either wanted pictures to collect reward money, being that he was directly involved in the demise of the outlaws, or they were taken for posterity. A short time later, Shaw's coffin was open and two of the cowboys had his body lifted out of the box and leaned up against the picket fence surrounding another man's grave. Shaw appeared to be smiling, which made all of the men uncomfortable, some of whom began to cry. After giving Shaw "a plentiful gulp of whiskey", taking a few pictures, and saying some prayers, his body was replaced in the coffin with a half-empty bottle and put back into the grave.

The pictures were displayed on the walls of the Wigwam Saloon in Winslow until the 1940s when the building was torn down. By that time, the ghost town of Canyon Diablo was reopened and renamed Two Guns. On October 28, 1905 Just seven months after the shooting in Canyon Diablo, Deputy Pemberton drunkenly shot and killed Winslow Town Marshal Bob Giles during a dispute in the Wigwam Saloon. Pemberton was arrested and found guilty, but he was acquitted after serving only a small fraction of his twenty-five year sentence.

See also

 List of Old West gunfights

References

Conflicts in 1905
1905 in Arizona Territory
American Old West gunfights
Arizona folklore
Aztec Land & Cattle Company
Crimes in Arizona Territory
April 1905 events